Thomas Hayes (born March 16, 1981) is an American former professional boxer who competed from 2002 to 2011.

Professional career
In September 2003, Hayes beat an undefeated Chris Koval (11-0) on an ESPN card. The bout was held at the Mountaineer Casino Racetrack and Resort in Chester, West Virginia.

On September 21, 2007 Hayes lost to undefeated Mexican-American Chris Arreola in a fight for the vacant WBC Continental Americas heavyweight title. The bout was televised on TeleFutura.

Professional boxing record

References

External links

Boxers from Illinois
Heavyweight boxers
1981 births
Living people
American male boxers